The Ulverston Canal is a  ship canal that connects the town of Ulverston, Cumbria, England with Morecambe Bay. The waterway, which is entirely straight and on a single level, is isolated from the rest of the UK canal network. It was built so that maritime trading vessels could use the town's port.

Ulverston Canal was built in the late 18th century. Wharves were built in the town to handle the cargo and goods being loaded and unloaded from seagoing vessels. The canal promoted the industrial development of Ulverston. Despite its loss of economic importance with the construction of the Furness Railway in the mid 19th century, the canal remained in commercial operation until the 1940s when it was eventually abandoned. The canal's preservation is now managed by a property management company that receives funding from GlaxoSmithKline, which has a plant adjacent to the canal. 

The canal runs between its former sea entrance, known as Canal Foot, at Hammerside Point on Morecambe Bay and its basin and wharves at Ulverston. The  sea lock was the only lock on the canal; however, the lock has been sealed with a concrete dam and footbridge. Beside the canal is a sheep and cattle auction and several waterside buildings have been renovated. At its mouth, the Bay Horse Hotel stands on the site of an 18th-century coaching inn; the Cumbria Coastal Way crosses the canal at this point.

History

Construction
Ships of up to 150 tonnes could reach the shore at high water, and 70 vessels were registered there. Trade in slate and ore was growing, and canal mania was gripping the country. A local solicitor, William Burnthwaite. organised a meeting in July 1791 to consider ideas for a canal to improve access to the town. He estimated the cost at £2,000. This sum had been raised by May 1792, but by then the engineer John Rennie had produced proper plans for a ship canal, estimated to cost £3,084, including the construction of a sea lock. By October 1792, around £3,800 had been raised, and the proposers decided to proceed.

A Private Act of Parliament for the canal received Royal Assent on 8 May 1793. The Private Act was entitled "An Act for making and maintaining a Cut or Canal from a Place called Hammerside Hill, in the parish of Ulverstone, in the county palatine of Lancaster, to a Place called Weint End, near the town of Ulverstone aforesaid." The Act empowered "The Company of Proprietors of the Ulverstone Canal Navigation" to raise amongst themselves, for the purposes of the Act, the sum of £4,000 in shares of £50 each, with an additional £3,000 if required.

The contract for the construction of the main canal was given to Pinkerton and Murray, while construction of the entrance lock was awarded to John Lancaster and James Duckworth. Work began on 23 August 1793, when the chairman cut the first sod, and was expected to be completed by September 1794. However, Pinkerton and Murray were also working on the northern end of the Lancaster Canal, and they abandoned the contract in August 1795, when they could no longer pay the wages. H. Baird took on the work, which was finished in October 1796.

The canal was opened in 1796 and provided the town of Ulverston with a port. To maintain the water level, a supply was taken from Newland Beck. Delays in construction meant that the final cost was over £9,200, and the opening coincided with a slump in the ore trade. It was not until June 1797 that William Burnthwaite was appointed as clerk, and a project to build a warehouse and toll office began, funded by a further call on the shareholders. Wharves for the transfer of slate and coal were constructed at the same time.

Operation

Before the Furness Railway was built, Furness was cut off by the mountainous Lake District on its only landward side; the region was accessed only by crossing the sands of Morecambe Bay, which was often dangerous. A passenger ferry to Liverpool from Ulverston Canal started in 1835, and it was later complemented by a service from Barrow-in-Furness to Fleetwood. A junction was formed with the Lancaster Canal. Coal, culm, and cinders from the Lancaster Canal to the Ulverston Canal were not liable to sea duty. The canal serviced the movement of goods to places as far as Glasgow and Cardiff.

Other industries developed as the canal was used more. Timber-related industries such as charcoal burning and hoop-making were common; shipbuilding, gas and chemical works, rail engineering works, and paper manufacturing activities also provided employment. In the 1800s there was a substantial shipbuilding industry at Ulverston, building wooden sailing ships which were strongly constructed to carry local ore rock cargoes. An example of an Ulverston ship is the barquentine Gaerwen of 249 tons, built in 1878 and later trading from Salcombe.

Decline

The opening of the Furness Railway in 1846 seriously damaged the profitability of the canal, which was eventually bought by the railway company. The rise of Barrow-in-Furness as a deep-water port also saw a decline in trade. After 1878, no ships were built in Ulverston. The canal was used commercially until the First World War and was officially abandoned at the end of the Second World War. It has since been maintained by Ulverston town council, who maintain a walkway on its eastern side. Its western side is still industrialised, with a large GlaxoSmithKline factory (built on the site of the former iron works and paper mills). Glaxo bought the canal from the town council in 1974 and used it as an emergency water reserve. In 2009, GlaxoSmithKline reviewed their operations at Ulverston and later sold the canal to Ulverston Canal Company, a company set up to manage the asset. This is a subsidiary of NPL Estates Ltd, which specialises in land management. A Trust has also been set up by GlaxoSmithKline, to ensure that funds are available for the canal's management, maintenance, and preservation.

Points of interest

See also

Canals of Great Britain
History of the British canal system

Bibliography

References

Canals in Cumbria
Ulverston
Canals opened in 1796
1796 establishments in England